Gula Matari is a 1970 studio album by Quincy Jones.

Track listing
 "Bridge Over Troubled Water" (Paul Simon) – 5:09
 "Gula Matari" (Quincy Jones) – 13:02
 "Walkin'" (Richard Carpenter) – 8:02
 "Hummin'" (Nat Adderley) – 8:08

Personnel
Pepper Adams - baritone saxophone
Danny Bank - bass and baritone saxophones
Hubert Laws - flute solos
Jerome Richardson - soprano saxophone solos
Freddie Hubbard, Danny Moore, Ernie Royal, Marvin Stamm, Gene Young - trumpet/flugelhorn
Wayne Andre - trombone
Al Grey - trombone solos
Toots Thielemans - guitar and whistle solo
Herbie Hancock, Bob James, Bobby Scott - keyboards
Grady Tate - drums
Don Elliott - bass marimba on "Gula Matari"
Jimmy Johnson, Warren Smith - percussion
Ray Brown - bass
Ron Carter - bass on "Gula Matari"
Richard Davis - bass on "Gula Matari"
Major Holley - bass and voice solo
Milt Jackson - vibes
Seymour Barab, Kermit Moore, Lucien Schmit, Alan Shulman - cello
Valerie Simpson, Marilyn Jackson, Maretha Stewart, Barbara Massey, Hilda Harris - vocals

Performance
Quincy Jones - arranger, conductor
Pete Turner - photography

References

1970 albums
Quincy Jones albums
Albums arranged by Quincy Jones
Albums produced by Creed Taylor
A&M Records albums
Albums conducted by Quincy Jones
Albums recorded at Van Gelder Studio